"Blag, Steal & Borrow" is the fourth single by English punk band Koopa. It was released as a download-only single on 8 January 2007. It became the first single released by Koopa to reach the UK top 40, charting at number 31.

The song became notable when it was revealed that it would be the first single to reach the UK's chart without being released on any traditional 'physical' format. This occurred after a change in chart rules a week previously, which meant that all legally downloaded singles would be eligible to chart. The single's success led to speculation as to whether it represented the first in a new trend of bands charting without getting a deal with a record company.

References

2007 singles
Koopa (band) songs
2007 songs
Song articles with missing songwriters